Decade of Hits may refer to:

Decade of Hits: The 30s 
A Decade of Hits, Kenny Rogers, 1997
Decade of Hits (George Canyon album)
Keeps Gettin' Better: A Decade of Hits, Christina Aguilera
A Decade of Hits (Charlie Daniels album), 1983
A Decade of Hits 1969–1979, Allman Brothers Band, 1991
Anthology: A Decade of Hits 1988–1998, Dream Warriors
So Fresh: A Decade of Hits (2000–2009), compilation album in the So Fresh series, 2010